Jean Njeim (Arabic: جان نجيم) (1915–24 July 1971) was a Lebanese Army general commander. He was born in Kfartyeh-Caza, Keserwan, Ottoman Empire in 1915. He entered the Military Academy at Homs as a cadet officer in 1933. He was promoted to colonel in 1959 and to brigadier general in 1965 and to general in 1967. Njeim was appointed commander of the Lebanese Army on 7 January 1979, replacing Emile Bustani who had been removed from the post. Njeim opposed to the expansion of the Palestine Liberation Organization in Lebanon. He was in office until his death in a helicopter crash on 24 July 1971.

References

External links

1915 births
1971 deaths
Commanders of the Lebanese Armed Forces
Victims of aviation accidents or incidents in Lebanon